is a train station on the Kita-Osaka Kyuko Railway (which links directly into the Osaka Metro Midosuji Line) located in Toyonaka, Osaka, Japan. It is named after the nearby Ryokuchi Park.

Line
Kita-Osaka Kyuko Railway Namboku Line (Station Number: M10)

Layout
There are 2 side platforms serving a track each under the roads Shin-Midosuji.

Surroundings
Hattori Ryokuchi Park
Toyonaka Municipal Terauchi Elementary School
Japan National Route 423
Hankyu Oasis
Kita-Osaka Kyuko Railway Co., Ltd.
Tengyu-syoten

History
The platforms and underground passage of this station were situated to be enable to open any time when the Kitakyu Namboku Line was opened in 1970. In those days, there was no development for residence around the area of the prepared station. Due to the development, the station was opened as an infill station on March 30, 1975.

Stations next to Ryokuchi-koen

Railway stations in Japan opened in 1975
Railway stations in Osaka Prefecture